Nong Bua Rawe is a district (amphoe) of Chaiyaphum province, northeastern Thailand.

History
The area was originally a tambon of Chatturat district. It was separated and together with tambon Wang Takhe became a minor district (king amphoe) on 17 April 1978. It was upgraded to a full district on 1 January 1988.

Geography
Neighboring districts are (from the north clockwise) Nong Bua Daeng, Ban Khwao, Chatturat, Sap Yai, Thep Sathit, and Phakdi Chumphon.

Sai Thong National Park is in the district.

Administration
The district is divided into five subdistricts (tambons), which are further subdivided into 58 villages (mubans). There are three subdistrict municipalities (thesaban tambons), each covering the whole same-named subdistrict: Nong Bua Tawe, Huai Yae, and Khok Sa-at. The remaining two subdistricts have a tambon administrative organization (TAO).

References

External links
amphoe.com (Thai)
http://www.rawedistrict.com Website of district (Thai)
 Sai Thong National Park

Nong Bua Rawe